Wan dam is located on wan river at the site of Wari village in Telhara Taluka of Akola District in Maharashtra, India. This is one of the largest irrigation projects in the Indian state of Maharashtra. The water is mainly used to irrigate agricultural land in the western vidarbha. It also provides water for drinking to near by towns, villages and Cities like Akola, Telhara Shegaon.The surrounding area of the dam has a garden old Hanumana temple.

Specifications

Purpose
Irrigation
Hydroelectricity
Water supply

See also
 Dams in Maharashtra
 List of reservoirs and dams in India
 Wan Hydroelectric Project

References

Dams in Akola district
Dams completed in 2000
2000 establishments in Maharashtra